Villosa is a genus of freshwater mussels, aquatic bivalve molluscs in the family Unionidae.

Species
Species within the genus Villosa:

 Villosa amygdala
 Villosa arkansasensis - Ouachita creekshell
 Villosa choctawensis - Choctaw bean
 Villosa constricta
 Villosa delumbis
 Villosa fabalis - Rayed bean
 Villosa iris - Rainbow mussel
 Villosa lienosa
 Villosa nebulosa
 Villosa ortmanni
 Villosa perpurpurea - Purple bean
 Villosa taeniata - Painted creekshell
 Villosa trabalis - Cumberland bean pearly mussel
 Villosa umbrans
 Villosa vanuxemensis
 Villosa vaughaniana  - Carolina creekshell
 Villosa vibex
 Villosa villosa

 
Bivalve genera
Taxonomy articles created by Polbot